This page is a list of the units of the British Army within the Army Reserve as of 2021.

The Honourable Artillery Company 

 Regimental Headquarters, at Finsbury Barracks, City of London
 Headquarters Squadron
 Honourable Artillery Company Band
 1 Squadron
 2 Squadron
 3 Squadron
 A (1st City of London) Battery – paired with 7 Parachute Regiment RHA

Royal Armoured Corps 
The Reserve regiments of the Royal Armoured Corps are known as Yeomanry.

 The Royal Yeomanry (Light Reconnaissance) — Paired with 1st The Queen's Dragoon Guards
 Regimental Headquarters, in South Wigston, Leicester (moved from Fulham)
 Command and Support (Westminster Dragoons) Squadron, at Fulham House, Fulham, London
 A (Sherwood Rangers Yeomanry) Squadron, in Carlton, Nottingham
 B (Warwickshire and Worcestershire Yeomanry) Squadron, at Alamein House, Dudley – formerly B (Staffordshire, Warwick, and Worcs Yeo) Sqn
 C (Kent and Sharpshooters Yeomanry) Squadron, at The Barracks, Croydon
 3 Troop, at Combermere Barracks, Windsor
 D (Shropshire Yeomanry) Squadron, in Telford
 Cardiff Troop, in Cardiff (formed in 2021)
 E (Leicestershire and Derbyshire Yeomanry) Squadron, in South Wigston, Leicester
 Royal Wessex Yeomanry (Armoured Replacement) — Paired with Royal Tank Regiment and Queen's Royal Hussars
 Regimental Headquarters, at Allenby Barracks, Bovington Camp
A (Queen's Own Dorset Yeomanry) Squadron, at Bovington Camp – regimental HQ squadron
B (Royal Wiltshire Yeomanry (Prince of Wales's Own)) Squadron, at Old Sarum House, Salisbury
C (Royal Gloucestershire Hussars) Squadron, in Cirencester
Cassino Troop, at the Precision Gunnery Training Equipment Suite, Venning Barracks, MoD Donnington
D (Royal Devon Yeomanry) Squadron, at Wyvern Barracks, Exeter
Barnstaple Troop, at Fortescue Lines, Barnstaple
Y (Royal Wiltshire Yeomanry (Prince of Wales's Own)) Squadron, in Swindon
 The Queen's Own Yeomanry (Light Reconnaissance) — Paired with regular The Light Dragoons
 Regimental Headquarters in Newcastle upon Tyne
 Command and Support (Northumberland Hussars) Squadron, Newcastle upon Tyne
 A (Yorkshire Yeomanry) Squadron, York
 B (Duke of Lancaster's Own Yeomanry) Squadron, Wigan
 C (Cheshire Yeomanry) Squadron, Chester
 The Scottish and North Irish Yeomanry (Light Reconnaissance) — Paired with regular Royal Scots Dragoon Guards
 Regimental Headquarters in Edinburgh
 A (The Earl of Carrick's Own Ayrshire Yeomanry) Squadron, Ayr
 B (The North Irish Horse) Squadron, Belfast
 C (Fife and Forfar Yeomanry) Squadron, Cupar
E Command and Support (Lothians and Border Horse) Squadron, Edinburgh

Royal Regiment of Artillery 

 National Reserve Headquarters, Royal Artillery
 Regimental Headquarters, at Royal Artillery Barracks, Woolwich Station
 All Arms Staff Pool
 221 (Wessex) Battery, at Royal Artillery Barracks, Larkhill Garrison
 255 (Somerset Yeomanry) Battery, at Upper Bristol Road Army Reserve Centre, Bath
 101 (Northumbrian) Regiment, Royal Artillery — Divisional MLRS paired with 26th Regiment Royal Artillery
 Regimental Headquarters and Headquarters Troop, at Napier Armoury, Gateshead
 203 (Elswick) Battery, in Blyth
 204 (Tyneside Scottish) Battery, in Kingston Park, Newcastle upon Tyne
 Hexham Troop, at Dare Wilson Barracks, Hexham
 205 (3rd Durham Volunteer Artillery) Battery, at Northfield Gardens, South Shields
 Catterick Troop, at Marne Barracks, Catterick Garrison
 269 (West Riding) Battery, at Carlton Gate, Leeds
 103 (Lancashire Artillery Volunteers) Regiment, Royal Artillery — Light gun regiment paired with 3rd Regiment Royal Horse Artillery and 4th Regiment Royal Artillery
 Regimental Headquarters and Headquarters Troop, at Jubilee Barracks, Saint Helens
 Lancashire Artillery Volunteers Band, at Nelson Street Army Reserve Centre, Bolton
 Lancashire Artillery Pipes and Drums
 208 (3rd West Lancashire) Battery, at Brigadier Philip Toosy Barracks, Liverpool
 Isle of Man Troop, at Lord Street Army Reserve Centre, Douglas, Isle of Man – formed in 2018
 209 (Manchester Artillery) Battery, at Belle Vue Street Army Reserve Centre, Manchester
 210 (Staffordshire) Battery, at Wolseley House, Wolverhampton
 C (South Nottinghamshire Hussars, Royal Horse Artillery) Troop, at Hucknall Lane Army Reserve Centre, Bulwell – formed in 2018
 216 (Bolton Artillery) Battery, at Nelson Street Army Reserve Centre, Bolton
 104 Regiment, Royal Artillery — Light gun regiment paired with 1st Regiment Royal Horse Artillery
 Regimental Headquarters and Headquarters Troop, at Raglan Barracks, Newport
211 (South Wales) Battery, in Abertillery
C (Glamorgan Yeomanry) Troop, in Cardiff
F (Brecknockshire and Monmouthshire) Troop
214 (Worcestershire) Battery, at Dancox House, Worcester
217 (City of Newport) Battery, at Raglan Barracks, Newport
266 (Gloucestershire Volunteer Artillery) Battery, at Artillery Grounds, Bristol
 105 Regiment, Royal Artillery — Light gun regiment paired with 19th Regiment Royal Artillery
 Regimental Headquarters, at Artillery House, Redford Barracks, Edinburgh
 206 (Ulster) Battery, in Newtownards
 B Troop, in Coleraine
 207 (City of Glasgow) Battery, in Glasgow
 212 (Highland) Battery, in Arbroath
 F Troop, in Kirkcaldy
 G Troop, at Fort Charlotte, Lerwick
 278 (Lowland) Battery "City of Edinburgh", in Livingston
 I Troop, at Redford Barracks, Edinburgh
 106 (Yeomanry) Regiment, Royal Artillery — Air defence regiment paired with 12th Regiment Royal Artillery and 16th Regiment Royal Artillery
 Regimental Headquarters and Headquarters Troop, Grove Park
 265 (Home Counties) Battery, Grove Park — paired with 12 (Minden) Air Assault Battery in 16 Air Assault Brigade
 295 (Hampshire Yeomanry) Battery, Portsmouth
 457 (Hampshire Carabiniers Yeomanry) Battery, Southampton

Corps of Royal Engineers 
 131 Commando Squadron, London/Plymouth/Bath
 135 Geographic Squadron, Ewell
 299 Parachute Squadron, in Kingston upon Hull — Supporting 23 Parachute Engineer Regiment
 No. 1 Parachute Troop, in Kingston upon Hull
 No. 2 Parachute Troop, in Wakefield
 No. 2 Parachute Troop, in Pontefract
 508 (Works) Specialist Team, Chilwell
 510 (Air Infrastructure) Specialist Team, Chilwell
 525 (Works) Specialist Team, Chilwell
 530 (Materiel) Specialist Team, Chilwell (Hybrid)
 534 (Airfields) Specialist Team, Chilwell
 Royal Monmouthshire Royal Engineers
 Regimental Headquarters and Headquarters Troop, at Monmouth Castle
 Jersey Field Squadron (Royal Militia of the Isle of Jersey), in Saint Helier, Jersey
 Guernsey Troop, at Saint Peter Port, Guernsey
 100 (Militia) Field Squadron, at Chapman House, Cwmbran
 1 Troop, at Artillery Grounds, Bristol
2 Troop, in Llandaff, Cardiff
 108 (Welsh) Field Squadron (Militia), at John Chard VC House, Swansea
 225 (City of Birmingham) Field Squadron (Militia), at Gundolph House, Oldbury
 1 Troop, at Baskeyfield House, Stoke-on-Trent
 2 Troop, in Cannock
 65 Works Group
 Group Headquarters and Support Echelon, Chilwell
 503 (Fuel Infrastructure) Specialist Team, Chilwell
 504 (Power Infrastructure) Specialist Team, Chilwell
 506 (Water Infrastructure) Specialist Team, Chilwell
 507 (Railway Infrastructure) Specialist Team, Chilwell
 509 (Port Infrastructure) Specialist Team, Chilwell
 71 Engineer Regiment — Paired with 39 Engineer Regiment
 Regimental Headquarters and Headquarters Troop, at Waterloo Lines, Leuchars Station
 103 (Tyne Electrical Engineers) Field Squadron, at Debdon Gardens, Heaton, Newcastle upon Tyne – formerly under 21 Engineer Regiment, but moved to 71 Engineer Regiment following Army 2020 Refine and designation changed from '1st Newcastle' to 'Tyne Electrical Engineers' subsequently
 2 Troop, in Sunderland
 102 (Clyde) Field Squadorn (Air Support), at Anzio Lines, Paisley
 2 Troop, in Cumbernauld
 124 (Lowland) Field Squadron (Air Support), in Glasgow
 2 Troop, at Waterloo Lines, Leuchars Station
 10 (Orkney) Troop, in Kirkwall, Orkney
 236 (Logistic) Troop, at Kinloss Barracks, Kinloss
 591 Field Squadron, in Bangor
 75 Engineer Regiment — Paired with 36 Engineer Regiment
 Regimental Headquarters and Headquarters Troop, at Peninsula Barracks, Warrington
 106 (West Riding) Field Squadron, at Bailey Barracks, Sheffield – formerly part of 32 Engineer Regiment, but transferred out following Army 2020 Refine
 2 Troop, in Batley
 107 (Lancaster and Cheshire) Field Squadron, in Birkenhead
 2 Troop, at Peninsula Barracks, Warrington
 202 Field Squadron, in Manchester
 101 (City of London) Engineer Regiment (Explosive Ordnance Disposal & Search)
 Regimental Headquarters and Headquarters Troop, at Hudson House, Catford
 217 (London) Field Squadron (EOD&S), in Ilford
 3 Troop, in Southend-on-Sea
 221 Field Squadron (EOD&S), at Hudson House, Catford
 1 Troop, in Bexleyheath
 350 (Sherwood Foresters) Field Squadron (EOD&S), at Foresters House, Chilwell
 2 & 3 Troops, at Wallis Barracks, Chesterfield
 579 Field Squadron (EOD&S), in Royal Tunbridge Wells
 2 (Surrey Yeomanry) Troop, in Redhill
 3 Troop, in Rochester

Royal Corps of Signals 
The Royal Corps of Signals reserve component was severely reduced after the 2009 Review of Reserve Forces, losing many full regiments, with their respective squadrons mostly reduced to troops.  Below is the list of units part of the corps down to platoon (troop) size.

 Joint Service Support Unit, at RAF Digby (Army Reserve elements)
 63 (Special Air Service) Signal Squadron, at Stirling Lines, Hereford and a troop in Portsmouth
Central Volunteer Headquarters, Royal Corps of Signals, at Basil Hill Barracks, Corsham
 254 (Specialist Group Information Services) Signal Squadron
 Royal Corps of Signals Specialist Pool
 Royal Corps of Signals Full Time Reserve Service
 32nd Signal Regiment
 Regimental Headquarters, in Glasgow
 2 (City of Dundee) Signal Squadron, in Dundee
 851 (Highland) Signal Troop, at Gordon Barracks, Aberdeen
 40 (North Irish Horse) Signal Squadron, in Belfast
 840 (Ulster) Signal Troop
 51 (Scottish) Signal Squadron, in Edinburgh
 852 (Lowland) Signal Troop, in East Kilbride
 52 Support Squadron, in Glasgow
 37th Signal Regiment
 Regimental Headquarters, in Redditch
 33 (Lancashire and Cheshire) Signal Squadron, in Liverpool
 842 (City of Manchester) Signal Troop, in Manchester
 880 (Cheshire Yeomanry (Earl of Chester's)) Signal Troop
 893 (East Lancashire) Signal Troop
 48 (City of Birmingham) Signal Squadron, in Birmingham
 896 (City of Coventry) Signal Troop, in Coventry
 898 Signal Troop
 64 (City of Sheffield) Signal Squadron, in Sheffield
 849 (City of Leeds) Signal Troop, in Leeds
 864 (City of Sheffield) Signal Troop
 887 (City of Nottingham) Signal Troop, in Nottingham
 54 (Queen's Own Warwickshire and Worcestershire Yeomanry) Support Squadron, in Redditch
 867 (Capability Development) Signal Troop
 39th Signal Regiment (The Skinners)
 Regimental Headquarters, in Bristol
 43 (Wessex and City & County of Bristol) Signal Squadron, in Bath
 857 (City and County of Bristol) Signal Troop, in Bristol
 53 (Wales and Western) Signal Squadron, in Cardiff
 Western Signal Troop, in Gloucester
 94 (Berkshire Yeomanry) Signal Squadron, in Windsor
 71st (City of London) Yeomanry Signal Regiment
 Regimental Headquarters, in Bexleyheath
 31 (Middlesex Yeomanry and Princess Louises's Kensington) Signal Squadron, in Uxbridge
 847 (Middlesex Yeomanry) Signal Troop
 841 (Princess Louises's Kensington) Signal Troop, in Coulsdon
 36 (Essex Yeomanry) Signal Squadron, in Colchester
 836 (Eastern) Signal Troop
 854 (East Anglian) Signal Troop
907 (Essex Yeomanry) Signal Troop, in Chelmsford
 68 (Inns of Court & City Yeomanry) Signal Squadron, in Whipps Cross
 847 (London) Signal Troop, in White City, London
 265 (Kent and County of London Yeomanry (Sharpshooters)) Support Squadron, in Bexleyheath

Infantry 

 The Royal Regiment of Scotland
 52nd Lowland, 6th Battalion, The Royal Regiment of Scotland — Paired with 2 SCOTS
 Battalion Headquarters and Headquarters Company, Glasgow
A (Royal Scots Borderers) Company, at Hepburn House, Edinburgh
Lowland Band of the Royal Regiment of Scotland
Platoon, in Galashiels
Platoon, in Bathgate, Edinburgh
B (Royal Highland Fusiliers) Company, in Ayr
Platoon, in Dumfries
C (Royal Highland Fusiliers) Company, in Glasgow
Platoon, at Scottish Rifles House, Motherwell
 51st Highland, 7th Battalion, The Royal Regiment of Regiment — Paired  with 3 SCOTS
 Battalion Headquarters and Headquarters Company, at Queen's Barracks, Perth
Highland Band of the Royal Regiment of Scotland
A (Black Watch (Royal Highland Regiment)) Company, in Dundee
Platoon, at Gordon Barracks, Aberdeen
Lovat Scouts Platoon, in Kirkcaldy
C (Highlanders (Seaforth, Camerons, and Gordons)) Company, in Inverness
Platoon, in Stornoway, Isle of Lewis
Platoon, in Elgin
D (Argyll and Sutherland Highlanders (Princess Louis's)) Company, Dumbarton
Platoon, Stirling
 The Princess of Wales's Royal Regiment (Queen's and Royal Hampshires)
 3rd Battalion, The Princess of Wales's Royal Regiment — Paired with 1 PWRR
 Battalion Headquarters and Headquarters Company, at Leros Barracks, Canterbury
Band of the Princess of Wales's Royal Regiment
A Company, at MoD Manston, Manston
2 Platoon, at Rowcroft Barracks, Ashford
B (Royal Sussex) Company, at Quebec Barracks, Brighton
4 Platoon, at Carter Barracks, Eastbourne
C (Royal West Kent) Company, in Rochester
 4th Battalion, The Princess of Wales's Royal Regiment — Paired with 1 R ANGLIAN 
 Battalion Headquarters and Headquarters Company, in Redhill
A (Queen's Royal Surreys) Company, in Farnham
B Company, in Edgeware
Machine gun Platoon, in Hornsey, London
C Company, in Cosham, Portsmouth
9 Platoon, in Southampton – formerly 9 (Isle of Wight) Platoon
D (Royal Sussex) Company, in Crawley
 The Duke of Lancaster's Regiment (King's, Lancashire and Border)
 4th Battalion, The Duke of Lancaster's Own Regiment — Paired with 1 LANCS
 Battalion Headquarters and Headquarters Company, at Kimberley Barracks, Preston
A (King's Regiment) Company, in Liverpool
Band of the Duke of Lancaster's Regiment
B (Queen's Lancashire Regiment) Company, at Somme Barracks, Blackburn
Platoon, in Blackpool
C (King's Own Royal Border Regiment) Company, in Barrow-in-Furness
Platoon, in Workington
Platoon, at Carlisle Castle
D (Queen's Lancashire Regiment) Company, in Manchester
 The Royal Regiment of Fusiliers
 5th Battalion, The Royal Regiment of Fusiliers — Armoured Infantry paired with 1 RRF
 Battalion Headquarters and Headquarters Company, at Anzio House, Newcastle upon Tyne
Band of the Royal Regiment of Fusiliers
A (Fusiliers) Company, in Birmingham
C (City of London Fusiliers) Company, at Fusilier House, Balham, London
X Company, at Anzio House, Newcastle upon Tyne
Z Company, at Anzio House, Newcastle upon Tyne
 The Royal Anglian Regiment
 3rd Battalion, The Royal Anglian Regiment — Paired with 2 R ANGLIAN
 Battalion Headquarters, at Blenheim Camp, Bury Saint Edmunds
No. 1 (Norfolk and Suffolk) Company, in Norwich
Platoon, in Lowestoft
No. 2 (Leicestershire and Northamptonshire) Company, in Leicester
Platoon, in Corby
No. 3 (Essex and Hertfordshire) Company, in Chelmsford
Platoon, in Hitchin
No. 4 (Lincolnshire) Company, at Westward House, Grimsby
Platoon, at Sobraon Barracks, Lincoln
No. 5 (Suffolk and Cambridgeshire) Company, at Blenheim Camp, Bury Saint Edmunds – HQ Company
Band of the Royal Anglian Regiment, in Peterborough
Platoon, in Peterborough
 The Yorkshire Regiment (14th/15th, 19th and 33rd/76th Foot)
 4th Battalion, The Yorkshire Regiment — Paired with 2 YORKS
 Battalion Headquarters and Headquarters (Helmand) Company, at Worsley Barracks, York
A (Alma) Company, at Halifax Barracks, Kingston upon Hull
Platoon, at Wolfe Armoury, Beverley
B (Burma) Company, at Fontenay Barracks, Barnsley
Platoon, in Sheffield
C (Corunna) Company, in Huddersfield
Band of the Yorkshire Regiment
Platoon, at Harewood Barracks, Leeds
Platoon, at Belle Vue Barracks, Bradford
D (Quebec) Company, in Middlesbrough
Platoon, at Somme Barracks, Catterick Garrison
 The Mercian Regiment (Cheshire, Worcesters and Foresters, and Staffords)
 4th Battalion, The Mercian Regiment — Armoured Infantry paired with 1 MERCIAN
 Battalion Headquarters and Headquarters Company, at Wolseley House, Birmingham
 Rifle Platoon, in Dancox House, Worcester
 Javelin Platoon, in Kidderminster
 B Company, at Ubique Barracks, Widnes
 Rifle Platoon, in Ellesmere Port
 Mortar Platoon, in Stockport
 C Company, at Nottingham
 Assault Pioneer Platoon, in Mansfield
 D (Staffords) Company, in Stoke-on-Trent
 Machine Gun Platoon, in Burton upon Trent
 The Royal Welsh
 3rd Battalion, The Royal Welsh — Armoured Infantry paired with 1 R WELSH
 Battalion Headquarters and Headquarters Company, at Maindy Barracks, Cardiff
Band and Corps of Drums of the Royal Welsh, at Raglan Barracks, Newport
B (Royal Regiment of Wales) Company, in Swansea
Platoon, in Aberystwyth
C (Royal Regiment of Wales) Company, in Pontypridd
Platoon, at Bethesda Street drill hall, Merthyr Tydfil – new
D (Royal Welch Fusiliers) Company, in Colwyn Bay
Platoon, in Caernarfon
 The Royal Irish Regiment (27th (Inniskilling), 83rd, 87th and Ulster Defence Regiment)
 2nd Battalion, The Royal Irish Regiment — Paired with 1 R IRISH
 Battalion Headquarters and Headquarters Company, at Thiepval Barracks, Lisburn
Band of the Royal Irish Regiment, in Holywood
A (Royal Ulster Rifles) Company, in Belfast
B (Royal Ulster Rifles) Company, in Newtownabbey
Platoon, at Lowfield Camp, Ballymena
C (Royal Irish Fusiliers) Company, in Portadown
Platoon, in Enniskillen
 The Parachute Regiment
 4th Battalion, The Parachute Regiment
 Battalion Headquarters and Headquarters Company, at Thornbury Barracks, Pudsey
A (Scottish Volunteers) Company, in Glasgow
Platoon, in Edinburgh
B Company, in White City, London
Platoon, at The Barracks, Croydon
Platoon, in Romford, London
C Company, at Thornbury Barracks, Pudsey
7 Rifle Platoon, at Chapman House, Hebburn
Platoon, at Altcar Training Camp, Saint Helens
D Company, at Seabroke House, Rugby
Platoon, in Lenton, Nottingham
Platoon, at Raglan Barracks, Newport
 The London Guards — Paired with the foot guards battalions under London District.
 Regimental Headquarters, in Battersea
G (Messines) Company, Scots Guards, in Westminster
Mortar Platoon, at Hudson House, Bellingham
No 15 (Loos) Company, Irish Guards, at Connaught House, Camberwell – battalion HQ coy
No 17 Company, Coldstream Guards, in Hammersmith
Ypres Company, Grenadier Guards, in Kingston upon Thames
Rifle Platoon, in Southall
 The Rifles
 6th Battalion, The Rifles — Paired with 1 RIFLES
 Battalion Headquarters, at Wyvern Barracks, Exeter
Headquarters Company, at Wyvern Barracks, Exeter
Salamanca Band and Bugles of The Rifles
Platoon, at Fortescue Lines, Barnstaple
Platoon, in Paignton
A (Gloucestershire) Company, in Gloucester
3 Platoon, at HMS Flying Fox, Bristol
Platoon, in Hereford
C (Devonshire and Dorset) Company, in Dorchester
Platoon, in Poole
D (Cornwall Light Infantry) Company, in Truro
Platoon, at Millbay Docks, Plymouth
 7th Battalion, The Rifles — Armoured Infantry paired with 5 RIFLES
 Battalion Headquarters, at Iverna Gardens drill hall, Kensington
 Headquarters Company, at Brock Barracks, Reading
 Waterloo Band and Bugles of the Rifles, at Edward Brooks Barracks, Abingdon-on-Thames
 A Company, at Edward Brooks Barracks, Abingdon-on-Thames
 2 Platoon, at Youens House, High Wycombe
 Javelin Platoon, at Viney House, Aylesbury
 B Company, in Swindon
 6 (Bulford) Platoon, at Ward Barracks, Bulford Camp
 C Company, at Brock Barracks, Reading
 G Company, in West Ham, London
 Platoon, in Mile End, London
Platoon in Kensington, London ( collocated with BHQ)
 8th Battalion, The Rifles — paired with 2 RIFLES
 Battalion Headquarters, Bishop Auckland
Headquarters Company, in Bishop Auckland
Assault Pioneer Platoon, in Sunderland
D (Rifles) Company, in Gilesgate
2 Platoon, in Sunderland
E (Rifles) Company, in Shrewsbury
5 Platoon, in Sparkbrook, Birmingham
Y (Rifles) Company, in Pontefract
8 Platoon, in Doncaster

Special Air Service
21st Special Air Service Regiment (Artists)
Regimental Headquarters and Headquarters Squadron, (Regent's Park)
 A Squadron (Regent's Park)
 C Squadron (Basingstoke/Cambridge)
 E Squadron (Newport/Exeter)
23rd Special Air Service Regiment
Regimental Headquarters and Headquarters Squadron, Birmingham
B Squadron, York/Kingston upon Hull
D Squadron, Edinburgh
G Squadron, Newcastle upon Tyne/Liverpool

Army Air Corps 

 6th Regiment Army Air Corps
 Regimental Headquarters, at Blenheim Camp, Bury Saint Edmunds
Headquarters Squadron, at Wattisham Airfield, Ipswich
No. 675 (The Rifles) Squadron, in Taunton
Yeovil Flight, at Salvation Army Hall, Yeovil
No. 677 (Suffolk and Norfolk Yeomanry) Squadron, at Blenheim Camp, Bury Saint Edmunds
B Flight, in Norwich
C Flight, at Wattisham Airfield, Ipswich
No. 678 (The Rifles) Squadron, at John Howard Barracks, Milton Keynes
Luton Flight, in Luton
No. 679 (The Duke of Connaught's) Squadron, at Duke of Connaught Barracks, Portsmouth
Middle Wallop Flight, at AAC Middle Wallop, Stockbridge

Royal Logistic Corps 

150th (Yorkshire) Transport Regiment — Paired with 6 Regiment RLC
 Regimental Headquarters and 523 Headquarters Squadron, at Londesborough Barracks, Kingston upon Hull
Regimental Band of 150 Regiment RLC
216 (Tyne Tees) Transport Squadron, at New Cliffords Fort, Tynemouth
217 (Yorkshire) Transport Squadron, at Harewood Barracks, Leeds
218 (East Riding) Transport Squadron, in Kingston upon Hull
219 (West Riding) Transport Squadron, at Scarbrough Barracks, Doncaster
 151st (Greater London) Transport Regiment — Paired with 10 Queen's Own Gurkha Logistic Regiment
 Regimental Headquarters and 508 Headquarters Squadron, in Croydon
124 Transport Squadron, in Warley
B Troop, in Maidstone
210 Transport Squadron, at Princess Royal House, Sutton, London
240 (Hertfordshire) Transport in Barnet, London
562 Transport Squadron, in Southall
G Troop, at Gale Barracks, Aldershot Garrison
 152nd (North Irish) Regiment RLC — Paired with 9 Logistic Regiment
 Regimental Headquarters, at Palace Barracks, Holywood
 277 (Belfast) Headquarters Squadron, at Palace Barracks, Holywood
 211 (Londonderry) Tanker Squadron, in Derry
 C (Coleraine) Troop, in Coleraine
 220 (Belfast) Tanker Squadron, at Palace Barracks, Holywood
 400 (Belfast) Petroleum Squadron, at Palace Barracks, Holywood
 154th (Scottish) Regiment RLC — Paired with 27 Regiment RLC
 Regimental Headquarters and 527 (Fife) Headquarters Squadron, at Bruce House, Dunfermline
221 (Glasgow) Transport Squadron, in Glasgow
230 (Edinburgh) Transport Squadron, in Edinburgh
239 (Fife) Transport Squadron, at Bruce House, Dunfermline
251 (Ayrshire) Transport Squadron, in Irvine
 156th (North West) Supply Regiment RLC
 Regimental Headquarters and 235 Headquarters Squadron, in Liverpool
234 (Wirral) Supply Squadron, in Oxton
236 (Manchester) Supply Squadron, in Salford, Manchester
238 (Sefton) Supply Squadron, in Bootle
381 (Lancaster) Supply Squadron, at Alexandra Barracks, Lancaster
 157th (Welsh) Regiment RLC — Paired with 4 Regiment RLC and 10 Queen's Own Gurkha Logistic Regiment
 Regimental Headquarters and 249 Headquarters Squadron, at Maindy Barracks, Cardiff
223 (South Wales) Transport Squadron, at The Grange, Swansea
224 (Pembroke Yeomanry) Transport Squadron, at Picton Barracks, Carmarthen
A Troop, in Haverfordwest
398 (Flintshire and Denbighshire Yeomanry) Transport Squadron, in Queensferry
580 (Royal Regiment of Wales) Transport Squadron, at Maindy Barracks, Cardiff
 158th (Royal Anglian) Transport Regiment — Paired with 7 Regiment RLC
 Regimental Headquarters and Headquarters Squadron, in Peterborough
160 (Lincoln) Transport Squadron, at Sobraon Barracks, Lincoln
201 (Bedford) Transport Squadron, in Bedford
Detached Troop, in Luton
202 (Ipswich) Transport Squadron, in Ipswich
M Troop, in Colchester
203 Transport Squadron, in Loughborough – 203 Sqn has no lineage with the Leicestershire and Derbyshire Yeomanry (its immediate predecessor) and therefore does not maintain its subtitle.
 159th (West Midlands) Support Regiment RLC — Paired with 6 Regiment RLC
 Regimental Headquarters and 243 Headquarters Squadron, in Coventry
123 Supply Squadron, in Telford
125 Supply Squadron, in Stoke-on-Trent
B Troop, in Burton upon Trent
237 (Midlands) Supply Squadron, in West Bromwich
B Troop, Kings Heath, Birmingham
294 (Grantham) Supply Squadron, at Prince William of Gloucester Barracks, Grantham
 162nd Movements Control Regiment – paired with 29 Regiment RLC
Regimental Headquarters and 279 Headquarters Squadron, in Nottingham
280 Movement Control Squadron, in Swindon
281 Movement Control Squadron, in Nottingham
282 Movement Control Squadron, at Hollis VC Armoury, Coulby Newham, Middlesbrough
871 Postal and Courier Squadron, at Youens House, High Wycombe
883 Postal and Courier Squadron, in Hartlepool
165th (Wessex) Port and Maritime Regiment – paired with 17 Port and Maritime Regiment RLC
 Regimental Headquarters and 264 Headquarters Squadron, in Derriford
142 (Queen's Own Oxfordshire Hussars) Vehicle Squadron, in Banbury
232 Port Squadron, in Bodmin
265 Port Squadron, in Derriford
266 (Princess Beatrice's) Port Squadron, in Southampton
710 (Royal Buckinghamshire Hussars) Operational Hygiene Squadron, at Viney House, Aylesbury
167th Catering Support Regiment, at Prince William of Gloucester Barracks, Grantham
Regimental Headquarters
111 Catering Support Squadron
112 Catering Support Squadron
113 Catering Support Squadron
2nd Operational Support Group, at Prince William of Gloucester Barracks, Grantham
500 Communications Troop
487 Operational Support Unit
499 Contract Management Unit
498 Labour Support Unit
 383 Commando Petroleum Troop, in Plymouth

Army Medical Services

Royal Army Medical Corps 

 Medical Operational Headquarters Support Group, at Queen Elizabeth Barracks, Strensall
 16 Medical Regiment (Regular)
 144 (Parachute) Medical Squadron, in Hornsey, London
 Glasgow Detachment, in Glasgow
 Cardiff Detachment, in Cardiff
 Nottingham Detachment, in Lenton, Nottingham
 201 (Northern) Field Hospital
 Regimental Headquarters, at Fenham Barracks, Newcastle upon Tyne
 A Detachment, at Barnard Armoury, Newton Aycliffe
 B Detachment, at Fenham Barracks, Newcastle upon Tyne
 C Detachment, in Norton, Stockton-on-Tees
 202 (Midlands) Field Hospital
 Regimental Headquarters, in Birmingham
 A Detachment, in Stoke-on-Trent
 B Detachment, in Birmingham
 C Detachment, in Shrewsbury
 D Detachment, in Abingdon-on-Thames
 203 (Welsh) Field Hospital
 Regimental Headquarters, in Llandaff, Cardiff
 A Detachment, in Swansea
 B Detachment, in Cwrt y Gollen
 South Detachment, in Llandaff, Cardiff
 C Detachment, in Bodelwyddan
 East Detachment, in Wrexham
 204 (North Irish) Field Hospital
 Regimental Headquarters, in Belfast
 A Detachment, in Belfast
 B Detachment, in Belfast
 C Detachment, in Belfast
 205 (Scottish) Field Hospital
 Regimental Headquarters, in Glasgow
 A Detachment, at Gordon Barracks, Aberdeen
 D Detachment, at Oliver Barracks, Dundee
 E Detachment, in Edinburgh
 I Detachment, in Inverness
 207 (Manchester) Field Hospital
 Regimental Headquarters, in Stretford
 A Detachment, in Stockport
 B Detachment, in Bury
 C Detachment, in Stretford
 208 (Liverpool) Field Hospital
 Regimental Headquarters, in Liverpool
 A Detachment, in Liverpool
 B Detachment, in Ellesmere Port
 C Detachment, in Blackpool
 Detachment, in Lancaster
 D Detachment, in Liverpool
 212 (Yorkshire) Field Hospital
 Regimental Headquarters, in Sheffield
 A Detachment, in Leeds
 B Detachment, in Nottingham
 C Detachment, in York
 D Detachment, in Lincoln
 225 (Scottish) Medical Regiment
 Regimental Headquarters, in Dundee
 152 Medical Squadron, in Glenrothes
 154 Medical Squadron, at Forthside Barracks, Stirling
 251 (Sunderland) Medical Squadron, in Sunderland
 153 Support Squadron, in Dundee
 243 (The Wessex) Field Hospital
 Regimental Headquarters, in Keynsham
 A Detachment, in Keynsham
 Detachment, in Gloucester
 B Detachment, at Wyvern Barracks, Exeter
 C Detachment, in Plymouth
 Detachment, in Truro
 D Detachment, in Portsmouth
 253 (North Irish) Medical Regiment
 Regimental Headquarters and Headquarters Squadron, in Belfast
 64 Medical Squadron, in Chorley
 107 Medical Squadron, in Belfast
 108 Medical Squadron, in Limavady
 Detachment, in Enniskillen
 109 Medical Squadron, in Belfast
 110 Medical Squadron, in Belfast
 254 (East of England) Medical Regiment
 Regimental Headquarters, in Cambridge
 161 Medical Squadron, in Colchester
 162 Medical Squadron, in Hitchin
 163 Support Squadron, in Cambridge
 256 (City of London) Field Hospital
 Regimental Headquarters, in Walworth, London
 A Detachment, in Walworth, London
 B Detachment, in Kensington, London
 C Detachment, in Kingston upon Thames, London
 D Detachment, in Brighton
 306 Hospital Support Regiment, at Queen Elizabeth Barracks, Strensall
 335 Medical Evacuation Regiment, at Queen Elizabeth Barracks, Strensall

Corps of Royal Electrical and Mechanical Engineers 

 101 Theatre Support Battalion
 Battalion Headquarters, in Bristol
 127 Theatre Support Company, in Manchester
 Detached Platoon, in Liverpool
 158 Theatre Support Company, in Bristol
 130 Detached Platoon, at Wyvern Barracks, Exeter
 159 Theatre Support Company, at Gordon House, Walsall
 Detached Platoon, in Telford
 Detached Platoon, in Swindon
 160 Theatre Support Company, in Bridgend
 Detached Platoon, in Gloucester
 102 Force Support Battalion
 Battalion Headquarters, in Newton Aycliffe
 124 (Tyne Electrical Engineers) Force Support Company, in Newton Aycliffe
 186 (Tyne Electrical Engineers) Detached Platoon, in Newcastle upon Tyne
 146 Force Support Company, at Budd VC Barracks, Scunthorpe
 Vehicle Platoon, at McKay VC Barracks, Rotherham
 147 Detached Platoon, in Kingston upon Hull
 153 Force Support Company, in East Kilbride, Glasgow
 B Platoon, in Grangemouth
 157 Force Support Company, in Holywood
 Vehicle Platoon, at Thiepval Barracks, Lisburn
 103 Force Support Battalion
 Battalion Headquarters, in Northampton
 118 Force Support Company, in Northampton
 126 Detached Platoon, at Westfield House, Coventry
 128 Divisional Support Company, in Portsmouth
 133 (Kent) Recovery Company, at Rowcroft Barracks, Ashford
 Detached Platoon, at The Barracks, Croydon
 148 Divisional Support Company, in Derby
 Detached Platoon, in Nottingham
 169 Platoon, in Barnet, London

Adjutant General's Corps 

 Central Volunteer Headquarters, Adjutant General's Corps, Educational and Training Services Branch Specialist Pool, at Sir John Moore Barracks, Winchester
 Central Volunteer Headquarters, Adjutant General's Corps, Staff and Personnel Support Specialist Pool, at Sir John Moore Barracks, Winchester
 Royal Military Police
 1st Regiment (Regular)
 116 Provost Company, in Cannock/Gorton
 243 Provost Company, in Livingston/Stockton on Tees
 3rd Regiment (Regular)
 253 (London) Provost Company, in Tulse Hill
 Allied Rapid Reaction Corps Military Police Battalion, Royal Military Police, at Sir John Moore Barracks, Winchester
 Special Investigation Branch Regiment (Regular), at Ward Barracks, Bulford Camp
 4 Investigation Company, at Ward Barracks, Bulford Camp
 Military Provost Staff Regiment (Regular), at the Berechurch Hall Camp, Colchester Garrison
 Military Provost Staff Reserve Company, at Colchester Garrison

Intelligence Corps 
Following the Army 2020 Refine, the Intelligence Corps' reserve component was slightly expanded by formation of the 6th and 7th MI Btns, in addition to 6 new companies.

 Specialist Group Military Intelligence, Hermitage — Administrative control of 3 MI Btn
 3 Military Intelligence Battalion — Paired with 1 MI Btn
 Battalion Headquarters and Headquarters Company, London
 31 Military Intelligence Company, London
 32 Military Intelligence Company, Cambridge
 33 Military Intelligence Company, Hampstead
 34 Military Intelligence Company, Hampstead
 35 Military Intelligence Company, London
 5 Military Intelligence Battalion — Paired with 1 MI Btn
 Battalion Headquarters and Headquarters Company, Edinburgh
 51 Military Intelligence Company, Edinburgh/Glasgow
 52 Military Intelligence Company, Newcastle upon Tyne (new)
 53 Military Intelligence Company, Leeds
 54 Military Intelligence Company, Bristol
 55 Military Intelligence Company, Nottingham
 6 Military Intelligence Battalion — Paired with 2 MI Btn (new battalion)
 Battalion Headquarters and Headquarters Company, Manchester (new)
 61 Military Intelligence Company, Manchester (new)
 62 Military Intelligence Company, Lisburn (new)
 63 Military Intelligence Company, Stourbridge/Bletchley (new)
 7 Military Intelligence Battalion — Paired with 4 MI Btn (new battalion)
 Battalion Headquarters and Headquarters Company, Bristol (new)
 71 Military Intelligence Company, Bristol/Cardiff
 72 Military Intelligence Company, Southampton/Exeter (new)
 73 Military Intelligence Company, Hermitage (new)

See also 
 List of units and formations of the British Army 2020
 Future of the British Army (Army 2020 Refine)
 Army Reserve (United Kingdom)

References List 

 Further Supplement evidence submitted by the Ministry of Defence.
 Army Website.

Footnotes

References 

 

Reserve Units